The 1978–79 season was the 80th season for FC Barcelona.

Squad

La Liga

League table

Results

External links

webdelcule.com

FC Barcelona seasons
Barcelona
UEFA Cup Winners' Cup-winning seasons